Budugumpa also spelled as Boodugumpa is a village in the Koppal taluk of Koppal district in the Indian state of Karnataka.

Geography
Budugumpa is located northeast to District Headquarters Koppal. Budugumpa Cross is the grade-separated intersection point of National Highway 50 and State Highway 23.

Demographics
As of 2001 India census, Budugumpa had a population of 3,530 with 1,824 males and 1,706 females and 573 Households.

See also
Gangavathi
Kukanapalli
Kushtagi
Hospet
Koppal

References

External links
www.koppal.nic.in

Villages in Koppal district